Fly Stereophonic is the fifth album by the singer/songwriter Lida Husik, released in 1997 through Alias Records.

Critical reception
The Chicago Tribune wrote that "the deft production touches ... quell any hint of folkish preciousness. What's left is an alluring 34-minute seduction, the songs revealing new layers of wonder with each listen." Salon called the songs "three-minute confections that sound like pop hits from another galaxy." CMJ New Music Monthly called Fly Sterephonic "perhaps Husik's most solid and structured record to date, robust and filled with compact yet expansive songs sung with her lush, incredibly sexy drone."

Track listing

Personnel
Charles Bennington – production
Cole Gerst – illustrations
Lida Husik – vocals, guitar, keyboards, Hammond organ
Charles Steck – bass guitar
Geoff Turner – production, engineering

References

External links 
 

1997 albums
Lida Husik albums